Statistics of Nadeshiko League Cup in the 2013 season.

Overview
INAC Kobe Leonessa won the championship.

Results

Qualifying round

Group A

Group B

Final round

Semifinals
INAC Kobe Leonessa 2-1 JEF United Chiba Ladies
Nippon TV Beleza 0-2 Okayama Yunogo Belle

Final
INAC Kobe Leonessa 3-1 Okayama Yunogo Belle

References

Nadeshiko League Cup
2013 in Japanese women's football